Pidor Sam Oeun (born 20 May 1996) is a Cambodian football player who currently plays for Preah Khan Reach Svay Rieng in the Cambodian League.

International career
He made his international debut in a Friendly Match against Bhutan on 20 August 2015.

References

External links
 

1996 births
Living people
Cambodian footballers
Cambodia international footballers
Sportspeople from Phnom Penh
Preah Khan Reach Svay Rieng FC players
Association football defenders
Competitors at the 2017 Southeast Asian Games
Southeast Asian Games competitors for Cambodia